Steele Township is one of fourteen townships in Rowan County, North Carolina, United States. The township had a population of 1,725 according to the 2010 census.

Geographically, Steele Township occupies  in western Rowan County.  There are no incorporated municipalities in Steele Township.

Sites of interest
The following churches, historic sites, and villages are located in Steele Township:
 Bear Poplar, since about 1775
 Ebenezer United Methodist Church, established in 1853
 Jude Church
 Kerr Mill, a grist mill built by Dr. Samuel Kerr in 1823, present site of Sloan Park 
 Liberty Hall School
 St. Luke's Lutheran Church, established in 1869
 Thyatira Presbyterian Church, founded about 1750

Adjacent townships
Atwell – south
Cleveland – northwest
Franklin – northeast
Locke – east
Mount Ulla – west
Unity – north

References

Townships in Rowan County, North Carolina
Townships in North Carolina